Continuous monitoring and adaptive control (CMAC) is a category of stormwater best management practice that allows for a wider range of operation of detention and retention ponds. CMAC systems typically consist of a water level sensor, an actuated valve, and an internet connection.

Specific applications of CMAC include flood protection, water quality treatment, water reuse, and channel protection.

See also
Urban runoff

References

External links
Chesapeake Bay Urban Stormwater Work Group

Flood control
Environmental engineering
Stormwater management
Water and the environment